Carposina viridis, the green carposinid moth, is a moth of the family Carposinidae. It was first described by Lord Walsingham in 1907. It is endemic to the Hawaiian islands of Kauai and Oahu.

The larvae feed on Cyrtandra cordifolia. The larvae bore in the stem of their host plant.

References

Carposinidae
Endemic moths of Hawaii
Moths described in 1907
Taxa named by Thomas de Grey, 6th Baron Walsingham